Henry Chavancy (born 22 May 1988 in Strasbourg) is a French rugby union player. He plays as a centre for Racing Métro in the Top 14.

Early life
He studied at lycée Saint-Louis-de-Gonzague and lycée militaire de Saint-Cyr after 2 years at the secondary school Joseph Kessel in Djibouti. He also studied 4 years at the Léonard de Vinci Business School.

Career

Club
Henry Chavancy has been playing for the Racing Métro 92 since 1999. He is 2005 French Taddei Champion, 2009 French Pro D2 Champion and 2011 Top 14 semi-finalist. He played his first game of Pro D2 during the 2007/2008 season. During the 2008/2009 season he played 20 games and become French Champion of Pro D2 with his team. Since 2009 he has been playing 54 Top 14 games and 8 games during the European Cup.

In 2016, he won Top 14 by defeating Toulon in the final at Camp Nou in Barcelona, before an attendance exceeding 99,000 people.

International
Under-20 French International player, he played the worldchampionship in June 2008 and then the college worldchampionship if rugby 7 the same year. In 2009 he played during six nations championship with the university French team. In June 2010 he was selected in the French team A for the Churchill Cup in the United-States.

Chavancy made his debut against Ireland in the 2017 Six Nations replacing Rémi Lamerat in the 59th minute of a 19–9 away loss.

Honours

Racing 92
 Top 14: 2015–16
 Pro D2: 2008–09
 European Rugby Champions Cup runner-up: 2015–16, 2017–18, 2019–20

References

External links
Player's profile on the Racing Métro 92 website
It's Rugby profile

French rugby union players
France international rugby union players
1988 births
Living people
Rugby union centres
Sportspeople from Strasbourg
French expatriates in Djibouti
Racing 92 players